David Muñoz Rosillo (born 15 January 1980) is a Spanish chef who is internationally recognised for his cooking and famous restaurants. He currently has three Michelin stars. His passion for cooking started when he was a child and his parents didn't let him play basketball due his short height (4 feet) so instead they used to take him frequently to the famous Madrid restaurant Viridiana. He soon became fascinated by the owner, Abraham García, a chef whose cooking reflects many of his personal interests, including literature, photography, minery, travel and art. These visits to the famous restaurant led David to go to catering college, where he began his further academic training. He combined his nursery studies with gaining experience by working in Spain and abroad, where he had the chance to develop further experience. His work led him to live in London, working in top restaurants such as Nobu or Hakkasan restaurant (Asian restaurants). He spent nearly two years at each.

DiverXO 
Back in Madrid, David decided to open his own business, but never imagined that it would become a temple of gourmet pilgrimage: DiverXO. He serves a single tasting menu, attracting people who are always willing to find, experiment and try out new culinary sensations: a fusion of Mediterranean and Chinese cooking with brushstrokes of Japanese.

StreetXO 
Originally opened in 2012, StreetXO is Muñoz's more casual and affordable restaurant.
Recently relocated at El Corte Ingles’s Gourmet Experience on Serrano 52, the restaurant includes exciting decor, delicious cocktails, and intriguing food. Apparently, the decor and the food are supposed conjure up a wet market in Hong Kong or a food alley in Singapore. Upturned crates serve as bar stools and neon signs line the walls.

London's StreetXO, which permanently closed its doors in 2020, was a direct offshoot of Madrid's, with similar decor and at least half the menu being identical, fusing Asian and Spanish cuisine. StreetXO london was David's first restaurant abroad.

Personal life 
David Muñoz was married to Ángela Montero Díaz, former manager and partner of diverxo. In 2009, they divorced. He is currently married to Cristina Pedroche, former prime-time Spanish TV presenter who hosts the widely successful Peking Express show in which 10 pairs race across the Far East. She is also an investor in his London business.

References

Living people
Spanish chefs
1980 births
People from Madrid